Pedro Miguel Moreira Póvoa (born 27 May 1980 in Porto) is a Portuguese taekwondo practitioner. He won a bronze medal for the 54 kg class at the 2004 European Taekwondo Championships in Lillehammer, Norway.

Povoa qualified for the men's 58 kg class at the 2008 Summer Olympics in Beijing, after winning his division from the European Qualification Tournament in Istanbul, Turkey. He lost the preliminary round of sixteen match to Dominican Republic's Gabriel Mercedes, who was able to score three points at the end of the game. Because his opponent advanced further into the final match, Povoa offered another shot for the bronze medal through the repechage bout, where he was defeated by Taiwanese taekwondo jin and defending Olympic champion Chu Mu-yen, with a score of (−1)–1.

References

External links

NBC 2008 Olympics profile

Portuguese male taekwondo practitioners
1980 births
Living people
Olympic taekwondo practitioners of Portugal
Taekwondo practitioners at the 2008 Summer Olympics
Sportspeople from Porto
European Taekwondo Championships medalists